Li Dengying (1914–1996) was a People's Republic of China politician. He was born in Shenmu County, Shaanxi Province. He was a member of the Chinese Workers' and Peasants' Red Army early in life. He was governor of Gansu Province (January 1981 – March 1983).

1914 births
1996 deaths
People's Republic of China politicians from Shaanxi
Chinese Communist Party politicians from Shaanxi
Governors of Gansu
Political office-holders in Gansu